The 1930 NCAA Wrestling Championships were the 3rd NCAA Wrestling Championships to be held. Penn State University in State College, Pennsylvania hosted the tournament at Rec Hall.

Oklahoma A&M took home the team championship with 27 points with three individual champions.

Team results

Individual finals

References

NCAA Division I Wrestling Championship
Wrestling competitions in the United States
1930 in American sports
1930 in sports in Pennsylvania